Bishop James Romen Boiragi is a Bangladeshi Roman Catholic bishop serving as bishop of the Roman Catholic Diocese of Khulna, Bangladesh.

Early life 
James was born on 3 May 1955 at Haldibunia, Bagerhat district, Bangladesh.  He studied at St. Paul's High School (at Shelabunia), Notre Dame College (Dhaka), Holy Spirit Major Seminary (Dhaka). After working as a pastor at St. Joseph's Cathedral in Khulna he went for higher studies in Canon Law at Urbaniana University in Rome, Italy, where he attained his Ph.D. degree in 1996.

Priesthood 
He was ordained a priest on 13 January 1985 at Khulna.

Episcopate 
He was appointed Bishop of Khulna on 4 May 2012 by Pope Benedict XVI. His episcopal ordination took place at Khulna on 15 June 2012. His motto is "Lead my sheep". He holds the chairs of Catholic Bishops’ Episcopal Commission for Catechetics and Biblical Apostolate alongside. He worked as the Vicar General and Vice Judicial Vicar of the Tribunal for the Diocese of Khulna before being nominated bishop of the diocese on 2 May 2012.

See also 
Catholic Church in Bangladesh

References

External links 

Living people
1955 births
21st-century Roman Catholic bishops in Bangladesh
People from Bagerhat District
Pontifical Urban University alumni
Bishops appointed by Pope Benedict XVI
Notre Dame College, Dhaka alumni
Bangladeshi Roman Catholic bishops
Roman Catholic bishops of Khulna